Immortal is a 2008 single/EP released by The Crüxshadows. It is the debut song for the newest lineup of the group, and is currently not included on an album.
The EP consists of the title song, a radio edit, a new mix of the DreamCypher song "Ariadne", a club mix of the title song, and an exclusive B-side track entitled "Exile".

Track listing
"Immortal"
"Immortal" (Radio edit)
"Ariadne" (Legendary Mix)
"Immortal" (Our Souls Enduring Club Mix)
"Exile"

External links
 The Crüxshadows' official website

The Crüxshadows EPs
2008 EPs